The 1974 X FIBA International Christmas Tournament "Trofeo Raimundo Saporta" was the 10th edition of the FIBA International Christmas Tournament. It took place at Sports City of Real Madrid Pavilion, Madrid, Spain, on 24, 25 and 26 December 1974 with the participations of Real Madrid (champions of the 1973–74 FIBA European Champions Cup), North Carolina Tar Heels, Cuba (semifinalists of the 1974 FIBA World Championship) and Estudiantes Monteverde (semifinalists of the 1973–74 FIBA European Cup Winners' Cup).

League stage

Day 1, December 24, 1974

|}

Day 2, December 25, 1974

|}

Day 3, December 26, 1974

|}

Final standings

References

1974–75 in European basketball
1974–75 in Spanish basketball